Aureusvirus is a genus of viruses, in the family Tombusviridae. Plants serve as natural hosts. There are six species in this genus.

Taxonomy
The genus contains the following species:
 Cucumber leaf spot virus
 Elderberry aureusvirus 1
 Johnsongrass chlorotic stripe mosaic virus
 Maize white line mosaic virus
 Pothos latent virus
 Yam spherical virus

Structure
Viruses in Aureusvirus are non-enveloped, with icosahedral and  Spherical geometries, and T=3 symmetry. The diameter is around 30 nm. Genomes are linear, around 4.4kb in length.

Life cycle
Viral replication is cytoplasmic, and is lysogenic. Entry into the host cell is achieved by penetration into the host cell. Replication follows the positive stranded RNA virus replication model. Positive stranded RNA virus transcription, using the premature termination model of subgenomic RNA transcription is the method of transcription. Translation takes place by leaky scanning, and  suppression of termination. The virus exits the host cell by tubule-guided viral movement. Plants serve as the natural host. Transmission routes are mechanical, seed borne, and contact.

References

External links
 Viralzone: Aureusvirus
 ICTV

Tombusviridae
Virus genera